Lockin may refer to:

 Lockin effect in superconductivity
 Danny Lockin (1943–1977), American actor and dancer

See also 
 Locking (disambiguation)
 Locked in (disambiguation), including "Lock-in"
 Login (disambiguation)